Israel competed at the 2022 World Games held in Birmingham, United States from 7 to 17 July 2022. Israeli athletes participated in ten sports, winning seven gold, three silver and four bronze medals, and attaining eleventh place overall at the Games, in its best showing to date.

Medalists

Israeli athletes won seven gold medals and placed eleventh overall in number of gold medals. Israeli athletes also won three silvers and four bronze medals. Israel finished in eleventh place overall in the Games, in its best showing to date.

Competitors
The following is the list of number of competitors in the Games.

Acrobatic gymnastics

Israel competed in acrobatic gymnastics; Meron Weissman and Adi Horwitz won the bronze medal for Mixed Pair.

Dancesport

Israel competed in dancesport.

Ju-jitsu

Israel won seven medals in ju-jitsu; Meshy Rosenfeld winning two gold medals in the Women's ne-waza 57 kg and Women's ne-waza open categories. and Nimrod Ryeder winning gold for Men's ne-waza 77 kg. Rony Nisimian	won the silver medal in the Women's ne-waza 63 kg	category.  Saar Shemesh won two bronze medals, in the Men's ne-waza 85 kg and the Men's ne-waza open categories, while Viki Dabush won a bronze medal in the Men's ne-waza 69 kg category.

Kickboxing

Israel won two gold medals in kickboxing;  Or Moshe winning in the Men's 75 kg	and Shir Cohen in the Women's 52 kg categories.

Lacrosse

Israel competed in both the men's and women's lacrosse tournaments.

Muaythai

Israel competed in Muaythai; Nili Block won the silver medal in the Women's 60 kg category.

Rhythmic gymnastics

Israel competed in rhythmic gymnastics; Daria Atamanov	winning two gold medals, in the Balls and Ribbon categories, and the silver medal in Clubs.

Sport climbing

Israel competed in sport climbing.

Water skiing

Israel competed in water skiing.

Wushu

Israel competed in wushu.

References

Nations at the 2022 World Games
2022
World Games